The Mariepauá River is a tributary of the Madeira River in the state of Amazonas, Brazil.

Course
The river defines the western boundary of the  Juma Sustainable Development Reserve, created in 2006 to support sustainable extraction of forest resources by the traditional population.
Two new species of fish have been found in the river.
In March 2015 Google launched imagery of the river in its "Street View" feature of Google Maps.

See also

List of rivers of Amazonas (Brazilian state)

References

Sources

Rivers of Amazonas (Brazilian state)